This is a list of libraries in Switzerland. The Swiss National Library (at 5.1 million volumes) and Basel University library (at 3.1 million volumes) are the country's largest. Switzerland also has a comprehensive public system with 2,344 branches holding a total of 28 million volumes. Important specialized institutions include the Swiss Federal Archives and the United Nations Office at Geneva.

Libraries of International Organizations 

 International Committee of the Red Cross Library 
 United Nations Office at Geneva

National libraries and networks 
 Swiss National Library, Bern
 Swiss Federal Archives, Bern
 Swiss National Sound Archives, Lugano
 Swiss Institute of Comparative Law
 Swiss Social Archives
 E-rara.ch
 ETH Library

Regional and city libraries 
 Bibliothèque de Genève
 Burgerbibliothek of Berne
 Pestalozzi-Bibliothek Zürich
 RERO (Library Network of Western Switzerland)
 St. Moritz Library
 Staatsarchiv Zürich
 Sukkulenten-Sammlung Zürich
 Zentral- und Hochschulbibliothek Luzern
 Zentralbibliothek Zürich

Specialized libraries 
 Abbey library of Saint Gall
 Bodmer Library
 Fitz Hugh Ludlow Memorial Library
 Iron Library
 Israelitische Cultusgemeinde Zürich (ICZ)
 Kloster Allerheiligen, Schaffhausen

University libraries 
 Basel University Library
 Cantonal and University Library of Lausanne
 Münstergasse Library, University of Bern

See also 
 List of libraries in Austria
 List of libraries in Germany
 Liechtensteinische Landesbibliothek

References

External links 

 
Libraries
Switzerland
Libraries